Teen Choice Award for Choice Female Hottie is one of many awards given at the Teen Choice Awards.

The following is a list of Teen Choice Awards winners and nominees for Choice Music - Female Hottie. Selena Gomez holds the record for 8 nominations and 3 wins. Britney Spears is the youngest winner in 2000 at the age of 18. Jennifer Lopez is the oldest winner in 2001 at the age of 32.

Winners and nominees

1999

2000s

2010s

References

Female Hottie